The men's 50 metre butterfly competition of the swimming events at the 2012 European Aquatics Championships took place May 21 and 22. The heats and semifinals took place on May 21, the final on May 22.

Records
Prior to the competition, the existing world, European and championship records were as follows.

Results

Heats
44 swimmers participated in 6 heats.

Semifinals
The eight fastest swimmers advanced to the final.

Semifinal 1

Semifinal 2

Swim-off
The race determined the last participant for the final.

Final
The final was held at 17:02.

References

Men's 50 m butterfly
Men's 50 metre butterfly